Lester Alfred "Red" Lanning (May 13, 1895 – June 13, 1962) was an American Major League Baseball pitcher and outfielder. He played for the Philadelphia Athletics during the  season. Lanning attended Wesleyan University.

References

Major League Baseball outfielders
Major League Baseball pitchers
Philadelphia Athletics players
Springfield Ponies players
Baseball players from Illinois
Wesleyan University alumni
1895 births
1962 deaths
People from Harvard, Illinois